Bedford is a city in Taylor County, Iowa, United States. The population was 1,508 at the 2020 census. It is the county seat of Taylor County. Lake of Three Fires State Park is located a few miles northeast of Bedford.

History
The community is believed to have gotten its name from Thomas J. Bedford, who was the first west bound Pony Express rider to deliver the mail on its final leg from Benicia, California to Oakland, California on April 23, 1861. Bedford is believed to have operated Bedfords Store and Trading Post in 1848 within the city limits. He moved to California later that year, in the California Gold Rush.

The community was called "Grove" when a post office was established on June 30, 1855. On June 24, 1856 it was changed to Bedford. Other histories have noted possible other sources of the name:

 Bedford in England (possible original home of early settlers)
 Bedford, Indiana (reputed home of the surveyor)
 Bedford, Pennsylvania (reputed home of  a "government engineer")

The community was formally established as the county seat of Taylor County by a legislative act in 1853. The town was formally laid out on lots sold on July 4, 1853 (which at the time identified the community as "Bedforde"). According to town legend, a barrel of whiskey was placed on the grounds and lots sold for $10 to $20 - although none of the lots were paid for at the time.

The present Taylor County Courthouse was built in 1893.

Geography
Bedford is located at  (40.668317, -94.721092), along the East Fork of the One Hundred and Two River.

Climate

According to the Köppen Climate Classification system, Bedford has a hot-summer humid continental climate, abbreviated "Dfa" on climate maps.

Demographics

2010 census
As of the census of 2010, there were 1,440 people, 614 households, and 382 families living in the city. The racial makeup of the city was 97.4% White, 0.5% African American, 0.1% Native American, 0.3% Asian, 0.8% from other races, and 1.0% from two or more races. Hispanic or Latino of any race were 1.3% of the population.

There were 614 households, of which 28.2% had children under the age of 18 living with them, 50.3% were married couples living together, 8.5% had a female householder with no husband present, 3.4% had a male householder with no wife present, and 37.8% were non-families. 33.1% of all households were made up of individuals, and 19.1% had someone living alone who was 65 years of age or older. The average household size was 2.29 and the average family size was 2.91.

The median age in the city was 43.9 years. 24.1% of residents were under the age of 18; 6.8% were between the ages of 18 and 24; 20.6% were from 25 to 44; 25.4% were from 45 to 64; and 23.2% were 65 years of age or older. The gender makeup of the city was 47.2% male and 52.8% female.

2000 census
As of the census of 2000, there were 1,620 people, 691 households, and 422 families living in the city. The racial makeup of the city was 98.15% White, 0.06% African American, 0.25% Native American, 0.12% Asian, 0.74% from other races, and 0.68% from two or more races. Hispanic or Latino of any race were 1.67% of the population.

There were 691 households, out of which 25.0% had children under the age of 18 living with them, 51.1% were married couples living together, 8.1% had a female householder with no husband present, and 38.9% were non-families. 33.1% of all households were made up of individuals, and 21.4% had someone living alone who was 65 years of age or older. The average household size was 2.28 and the average family size was 2.95.

Age spread: 23.0% under the age of 18, 7.4% from 18 to 24, 23.2% from 25 to 44, 19.8% from 45 to 64, and 26.7% who were 65 years of age or older. The median age was 42 years. For every 100 females, there were 84.1 males. For every 100 females age 18 and over, there were 79.6 males.

The median income for a household in the city was $28,125, and the median income for a family was $34,943. Males had a median income of $27,788 versus $18,125 for females. The per capita income for the city was $14,313. About 10.4% of families and 13.7% of the population were below the poverty line, including 21.4% of those under age 18 and 12.2% of those age 65 or over.

Education
It is within the Bedford Community School District.

See also
Lenox Round Barn, part of the Taylor County Historical Museum and listed on the National Register of Historic Places.

References

 
Cities in Iowa
Cities in Taylor County, Iowa
County seats in Iowa
Populated places established in 1855
1855 establishments in Iowa